Selikhov, female form Selikhova is a Russian surname. Notable people with this surname include:

 Aleksandr Selikhov (born 1994), Russian football player
 Aleksey Selikhov, Russian equestrian
 Lidia Selikhova (1922–2003), Russian skater
 Yuri Selikhov (born 1941), Russian basketball player
 Yury Selikhov (born 1986), Russian bobsledder